Mizo may refer to:

Mizo people, an ethnic group native to north-eastern India, western Myanmar (Burma) and eastern Bangladesh
Mizo language, a language spoken by the Mizo people
Mizoram, a state in Northeast India
Lusei people, an ethnic group belonging to the Mizo Tribe
Chin peoples, a name given in the old Burmese literature referring to Mizo people
Lushai Hills, a mountain range in Mizoram and Tripura, part of a Patkai range
Mizo Union the first political party in Mizoram, northeast India
Mizo National Front (MNF), a regional political  party in Mizoram, India
Mizo Accord an accord signed between the Mizo National Front and the Government of India on June 30, 1986

Language and nationality disambiguation pages